Jonah Martin Edelman (born October 9, 1970) is an American advocate for public education. He is the co-founder and chief executive officer of Stand for Children, a national American education advocacy organization based in Portland, Oregon, with affiliates in nine states.

Background and education

Jonah Edelman is the second son of Marian Wright Edelman, former civil rights leader and aide to Martin Luther King Jr. and founder and president of the Children’s Defense Fund, and Peter Edelman, former aide to Senator Robert F. Kennedy, former assistant secretary of the Department of Health and Human Services, and professor at Georgetown University Law Center. His brother Ezra produced and directed the documentary O.J.: Made in America.

Edelman was born and raised in Washington, D.C., and received his B.A. in history with a concentration on African-American studies from Yale University in 1992, where he was awarded the Alpheus Henry Snow Prize. Edelman attended Balliol College, Oxford on a Rhodes Scholarship, earning his Master of Philosophy in 1994 and Doctor of Philosophy in 1995, both in politics.

Edelman cites tutoring a six-year-old bilingual child named Daniel Zayas in reading while volunteering at Dwight Elementary School during his first year at Yale as a turning point.  While still an undergraduate, he ran a teen pregnancy prevention speakers' bureau, co-founded a mentorship program for African American middle school students, and served as an administrator of an enrichment program for children living in public housing—Leadership Education and Athletics in Partnership (LEAP). Jonah Edelman is married to Charese Rohny, has twin sons and lives in Portland, Oregon.

Stand for Children

Edelman was a key organizer of Stand for Children Day, a June 1, 1996 rally at the Lincoln Memorial in Washington, D.C., attended by 300,000 people.  Among the speakers at this rally, the largest for children in U.S. history, were Geoffrey Canada, who later became Stand for Children’s first board of directors chair, the editor of Parade Magazine, Walter Anderson, who came up with the name "Stand for Children Day," and Marian Wright Edelman.

On June 2, 1996, Edelman and Eliza Leighton founded Stand for Children as an ongoing advocacy organization to support rally participants when they returned home.  Hundreds of follow up Stand for Children events and rallies took place across the country on June 1, 1997, and then June 1, 1998.

Stand for Children's mission is to ensure all students receive a high quality, relevant education, especially those whose boundless potential is overlooked or under-tapped because of their skin color, zip code, first language, or disability. Stand's top priority areas concern increasing high school graduation rates, college and career preparation, literacy proficiency levels of economically disadvantaged students, and achieving equitable and adequate funding.

In the 24 years since its founding, Stand has achieved numerous legislative victories for students and created programs aimed at boosting academic success. Stand helped secure the passage and full funding of Measure 98 in Oregon, which provides $303 million to enable the state's school districts to expand evidence-based dropout prevention strategies, career technical education pathways, college credit courses, and post-secondary counseling. In Washington, Stand helped pass the nation's first-ever statewide Advanced Placement course enrollment equity requirement. Stand also played a pivotal role in advocating for the passage of funding for full-day kindergarten in Colorado in 2019.

In 2017, Stand developed the Center for High School Success, which partners with school districts in multiple Stand-affiliate states to provide educators with resources, training, and data needed to ensure more ninth grade students stay on track to graduation.

Past controversy

At the Aspen Ideas Festival on June 28, 2011, Edelman was the center of a controversy due to remarks he made regarding recent concessions by teachers' unions leading to landmark education reform legislation in Illinois.  While unions and legislators say they engaged in a collaborative effort in which all sides gave a little in an effort to improve Illinois’ schools, Edelman told attendees at the Festival, that, actually, he led a well-funded campaign that used lobbyists and shrewd political gamesmanship to pressure union leaders to give up their rights."

Subsequent to this speech, a video of Edelman’s lecture went viral.  Afterwards, he apologized for his "arrogance" in claiming his political manipulations alone passed the bill to the exclusion of unions’ contributions. The Illinois Education Association declined his apology.

"They essentially gave away every single provision related to teacher effectiveness that we had proposed — everything we had fought for in Colorado," Edelman said in Aspen. "We hired 11 lobbyists, including four of the absolute best insiders and seven of the best minority lobbyists, preventing the unions from hiring them."  He further stated, "There was a palpable sense of concern if not shock on the part of the teachers’ unions of Illinois that Speaker [of the House Mike] Madigan had changed allegiance and that we had clear political capability to potentially jam this proposal down their throats the same way that pension reform had been jammed down their throats six months earlier."

Honors

 2007: Ashoka Fellow
 2005: Hunt Alternatives Fund Prime Mover
 1992: Rhodes Scholarship
 1992: Alpheus Henry Snow Prize, Yale University

References

External links
 Stand for Children
Biography page at Stand for Children
 "Jonah Edelman: The Activist." Time Magazine profile.
"School vouchers don’t just undermine public schools, they undermine our democracy." Op-ed co-authored by Edelman and Randi Weingarten, president of the American Federation of Teachers.

Videos
 Edelman discusses newly passed Illinois Senate Bill 7 legislation with Chicago newscaster on Tuesday, June 14, 2011 (2:54 minutes)
 Presentation by Jonah Edelman at City Club of Portland on Friday, February 20, 2009 (62:54 minutes)
 Clip of Jonah Edelman at the Aspen Ideas Festival, discussing political maneuvers to pass SB7 in Illinois, June 28, 2011 (14:44 minutes)

American Rhodes Scholars
People from Washington, D.C.
Yale College alumni
1970 births
Living people
American people of Polish-Jewish descent
Activists from Portland, Oregon
African-American Jews
Ashoka Fellows